This is an alphabetical list of all articles relating to the fictional "Buffyverse", including Buffy the Vampire Slayer (film and television series), Angel, the comics, and other media. Names of actors and other personnel are bolded to distinguish them from characters and other in-universe articles.

A
 "A Hole in the World" (Angel episode)
 "A New Man" (Buffy the Vampire Slayer episode)
 "A New World" (Angel episode)
 Adam (Buffy the Vampire Slayer)
 After Image (Buffy novel)
 "After Life" (Buffy the Vampire Slayer episode)
 "After These Messages... We'll Be Right Back!" (Buffy comic)
 Alexis Denisof
 "All the Way" (Buffy the Vampire Slayer episode)
 Alyson Hannigan
 Amber Benson
 "Amends" (Buffy the Vampire Slayer episode)
 Amy Acker
 Amy Madison
 Andy Hallett
 Andrew Wells
 "Angel" (Buffy the Vampire Slayer episode)
 Angel (character)
 Angel DVDs
 Angel Investigations
 Angel: The Hollower
 Angel (TV series)
 Angel: Live Fast, Die Never
 "Anne" (Buffy the Vampire Slayer episode)
 Anointed One (Buffyverse)
 Anthony Stewart Head
 Anya Jenkins
 "Anywhere but Here" (Buffy comic)
 "Apocalypse, Nowish" (Angel episode)
 Apocalypse Memories (Buffy novel)
 "Are You Now or Have You Ever Been" (Angel episode)
 "As You Were" (Buffy the Vampire Slayer episode)
 Autumnal (Buffy comic)
 Avatar (Angel novel)
 "Awakening" (Angel episode)

B
 "Bachelor Party" (Angel episode)
 Bad Blood (Buffy comic)
 "Bad Eggs" (Buffy the Vampire Slayer episode)
 "Bad Girls" (Buffy the Vampire Slayer episode)
 "Band Candy" (Buffy the Vampire Slayer episode)
 "Bargaining" (Buffy the Vampire Slayer episodes) (two-part episode)
 "A Beautiful Sunset" (Buffy comic)
 "Beauty and the Beasts" (Buffy the Vampire Slayer episode)
 "Becoming" (Buffy the Vampire Slayer episodes) (two-part episode)
 "Beer Bad" (Buffy the Vampire Slayer episode)
 "Belonging" (Angel episode)
 Ben Edlund
 "Beneath You" (Buffy the Vampire Slayer episode)
 "Benediction" (Angel episode)
 "Bewitched, Bothered and Bewildered" (Buffy the Vampire Slayer episode)
 Big Bad
 "Billy" (Angel episode)
 "Birthday" (Angel episode)
 Blackout (Buffy novel)
 "Blind Date" (Angel episode)
 Blood and Fog (Buffy novel)
 "Blood Money" (Angel episode)
 The Blood of Carthage (Buffy comic)
 "Blood Ties" (Buffy the Vampire Slayer episode)
 Blooded (Buffy novel)
 "The Body" (Buffy the Vampire Slayer episode)
 Book of the Dead (Angel novel)
 The Book of Fours (Buffy novel)
 "Bring on the Night" (Buffy the Vampire Slayer episode)
 Bringers of the First Evil
 Bruja (Angel novel)
Buffering the Vampire Slayer (podcast)
 Buffy/Angel novels
 Buffy studies
 Buffy Summers
 Buffy the Vampire Slayer (TV series)
 Buffy the Animated Series (undeveloped)
 Buffy the Vampire Slayer: Chaos Bleeds
 Buffy the Vampire Slayer Collectible Card Game
 Buffy the Vampire Slayer comics
 Buffy the Vampire Slayer DVDs
 Buffy the Vampire Slayer (film)
 Buffy the Vampire Slayer (handheld game)
 Buffy the Vampire Slayer in popular culture
 Buffy the Vampire Slayer Magazine incorporating Angel Magazine
 Buffy the Vampire Slayer: Radio Sunnydale – Music from the TV Series
 Buffy the Vampire Slayer Season Eight
 Buffy the Vampire Slayer Season Nine (forthcoming)
 Buffy the Vampire Slayer: The Quest for Oz
 Buffy the Vampire Slayer: The Album
 Buffy the Vampire Slayer video games
 Buffy the Vampire Slayer: Wrath of the Darkhul King
 Buffy the Vampire Slayer (Xbox)
 "Buffy vs. Dracula" (Buffy the Vampire Slayer episode)
 Buffybot
 Buffyverse
 Buffyverse canon
 Buffyverse role-playing games

C
 Caleb (Buffy the Vampire Slayer)
 "Calvary" (Angel episode)
 Carnival of Souls (Buffy novel)
 "Carpe Noctem" (Angel episode)
 Cassie Newton
 "The Cautionary Tale of Numero Cinco" (Angel episode)
 "The Chain" (Buffy comic)
 Charisma Carpenter
 Charles Gunn (Angel)
 "Checkpoint" (Buffy the Vampire Slayer episode)
 Child of the Hunt (Buffy novel)
 "Choices" (Buffy the Vampire Slayer episode)
 "Chosen" (Buffy the Vampire Slayer episode)
 Christian Kane
 Christopher Golden
 "City Of" (Angel episode)
 Close to the Ground (Angel novel)
 Colony (Buffy novel)
 Connor (Angel)
 "Consequences" (Buffy the Vampire Slayer episode)
 "Conversations with Dead People" (Buffy the Vampire Slayer episode)
 "Conviction" (Angel episode)
 Cordelia Chase
 "Couplet" (Angel episode)
 "Corrupt" (unaired Angel episode)
 Coyote Moon (Buffy novel)
 Crossings (Buffy novel)
 "Crush" (Buffy the Vampire Slayer episode)
 The Curse (Angel comic)
 Cursed (Buffy/Angel novel)

D
 D'Hoffryn
 "Dad" (Angel episode)
 "Damage" (Angel episode)
 Danny Strong
 "The Dark Age" (Buffy the Vampire Slayer episode)
 Dark Congress (Buffy novel)
 Dark Mirror (Angel novel)
 "Darla" (Angel episode)
 Darla (Buffy the Vampire Slayer character)
 David Boreanaz
 David Fury
 Dawn Summers
 "Dead End" (Angel episode)
 "Dead Man's Party" (Buffy the Vampire Slayer episode)
 The Death of Buffy (Buffy comic)
 "Dead Things" (Buffy the Vampire Slayer episode)
 "Dear Boy" (Angel episode)
 Deep Water (Buffy novel)
 "Destiny" (Angel episode)
 Dingoes Ate My Baby
 "Dirty Girls" (Buffy the Vampire Slayer episode)
 "Disharmony" (Angel episode)
 "Doomed" (Buffy the Vampire Slayer episode)
 Doomsday Deck (Buffy novel)
 "Doppelgängland" (Buffy the Vampire Slayer episode)
 "Double or Nothing" (Angel episode)
 "Doublemeat Palace" (Buffy the Vampire Slayer episode)
 Doug Petrie
 Doyle (Angel)
 Doyle: Spotlight (Angel comic)
 Drew Goddard
 Drew Greenberg
 Drusilla (Buffy the Vampire Slayer)
 Dust Waltz (Buffy comic)

E
 "Earshot" (Buffy the Vampire Slayer episode)
 Eliza Dushku
 Emma Caulfield
 "Empty Places" (Buffy the Vampire Slayer episode)
 "End of Days" (Buffy the Vampire Slayer episode)
 Endangered Species (Angel novel)
 "Enemies" (Buffy the Vampire Slayer episode)
 "Entropy" (Buffy the Vampire Slayer episode)
 "Epiphany" (Angel episode)
 "Eternity" (Angel episode)
 Ethan Rayne
 Eve (Angel)
 The Evil That Men Do (Buffy novel)
 "Expecting" (Angel episode)
 Eyghon

F
 "Faith, Hope & Trick" (Buffy the Vampire Slayer episode)
 Faith Lehane
 "Family" (Buffy the Vampire Slayer episode)
 False Memories (Buffy comic)
 "Fear, Itself" (Buffy the Vampire Slayer episode)
 Fearless (Angel novel)
 The Final Cut (Buffy comic)
 "First Date" (Buffy the Vampire Slayer episode)
 First Evil
 "First Impressions" (Angel episode)
 "Five by Five" (Angel episode)
 "Flooded" (Buffy the Vampire Slayer episode)
 "Fool for Love" (Buffy the Vampire Slayer episode)
 "Forever" (Buffy the Vampire Slayer episode)
 "Forgiving (Angel)" (Angel episode)
 Fray (comic)
 "Fredless" (Angel episode)
 "The Freshmen" (Buffy the Vampire Slayer episode)

G
 The Gatekeeper (Buffy novel series)
 Gavin Park
 "Get It Done" (Buffy the Vampire Slayer episode)
 Ghoul Trouble (Buffy novel)
 "The Gift" (Buffy the Vampire Slayer episode)
 "Gingerbread" (Buffy the Vampire Slayer episode)
 "The Girl in Question" (Angel episode)
 Glenn Quinn
 Glory (Buffy the Vampire Slayer)
 Go Ask Malice: A Slayer's Diary (Buffy novel)
 "Go Fish" (Buffy the Vampire Slayer episode)
 "Gone" (Buffy the Vampire Slayer episode)
 "Goodbye Iowa" (Buffy the Vampire Slayer episode)
 "Graduation Day" (Buffy the Vampire Slayer episodes) (two-part episode)
 "Grave" (Buffy the Vampire Slayer episode)
 Groosalugg
 "Ground State" (Angel episode)
 "Guise Will Be Guise" (Angel episode)
 Gunn: Spotlight (Angel comic)

H
 "Habeas Corpses" (Angel episode)
 Halfrek
 "Halloween" (Buffy the Vampire Slayer episode)
 Halloween Rain (Buffy novel)
 "Happy Anniversary" (Angel episode)
 "Harm's Way" (Angel episode)
 Harmony Kendall
 "The Harsh Light of Day" (Buffy the Vampire Slayer episode)
 "The Harvest" (Buffy the Vampire Slayer episode)
 Haunted (Angel novel)
 Haunted (Buffy comic)
 "Heartthrob" (Angel episode)
 Heat (Buffy/Angel novel)
 "Hell's Bells" (Buffy the Vampire Slayer episode)
 "Hell Bound" (Angel episode)
 "Help" (Buffy the Vampire Slayer episode)
 "Helpless" (Buffy the Vampire Slayer episode)
 Here Be Monsters (Buffy novel)
 "Hero" (Angel episode)
 "Him" (Buffy the Vampire Slayer episode)
 Holland Manners
 Hollywood Noir (Angel novel)
 Daniel Holtz
 "Home" (Angel episode)
 "Homecoming" (Buffy the Vampire Slayer episode)
 "The House Always Wins" (Angel episode)
 How I Survived My Summer Vacation (Buffy novel)
 Hunting Ground (Angel comic)
 "Hush" (Buffy the Vampire Slayer episode)
 Hyperion Hotel

I
 "The I in Team" (Buffy the Vampire Slayer episode)
 "I've Got You Under My Skin" (Angel episode)
 "I, Robot... You, Jane" (Buffy the Vampire Slayer episode)
 "I Fall to Pieces" (Angel episode)
 "I Only Have Eyes for You" (Buffy the Vampire Slayer episode)
 "I Was Made to Love You" (Buffy the Vampire Slayer episode)
 "I Will Remember You" (Angel episode)
 Illyria (Angel)
 Illyria: Spotlight (Angel comic)
 Image (Angel novel)
 Immortal (Buffy novel)
 Impressions (Angel novel)
 "In the Dark" (Angel episode)
 "Inca Mummy Girl" (Buffy the Vampire Slayer episode)
 India Cohen
 "The Initiative" (Buffy the Vampire Slayer episode)
 "Innocence" (Buffy the Vampire Slayer episode)
 "Inside Out" (Angel episode)
 "Intervention" (Buffy the Vampire Slayer episode)
 "Into the Woods" (Buffy the Vampire Slayer episode)

J
 J. August Richards
 James Marsters
 Jane Espenson
 Jasmine (Angel)
 Jeff Mariotte
 Jeffrey Bell
 Jenny Calendar
 Jesse McNally
 Jonathan (Buffy comic)
 Jonathan Levenson
 Joss Whedon
 Joyce Summers
 "Judgment" (Angel episode)
 Julie Benz
 Juliet Landau
 "Just Rewards" (Angel episode)

K
 Kate Lockley
 Keep Me in Mind (Buffy novel)
 "Killed by Death" (Buffy the Vampire Slayer episode)
 "The Killer in Me" (Buffy the Vampire Slayer episode)
 Kristine Sutherland

L
 "Lessons" (Buffy the Vampire Slayer episode)
 "Lie to Me" (Buffy the Vampire Slayer episode)
 "Lies My Parents Told Me" (Buffy the Vampire Slayer episode)
 "Life Serial" (Buffy the Vampire Slayer episode)
 "Life of the Party" (Angel episode)
 Lilah Morgan
 Lindsey McDonald
 "Lineage" (Angel episode)
 List of Angel characters
 List of Angel comics
 List of Angel episodes
 List of Angel novels
 List of awards and nominations received by Buffy the Vampire Slayer and Angel
 List of Buffy the Vampire Slayer characters (major characters)
 List of Buffy the Vampire Slayer episodes
 List of Buffy the Vampire Slayer novels
 List of Buffyverse comics
 List of Buffyverse guidebooks
 List of Buffyverse novels
 List of Buffyverse villains and supernatural beings
 List of minor Angel characters
 List of minor Buffy the Vampire Slayer characters
 "Listening to Fear" (Buffy the Vampire Slayer episode)
 Little Things (Buffy novel)
 "Living Conditions" (Buffy the Vampire Slayer episode)
 "Lonely Hearts" (Angel episode)
 "Long Day's Journey" (Angel episode)
 The Longest Night (Angel novel)
 The Long Way Home (Buffy comic)
 Lorne (Angel)
 The Lost Slayer (Buffy novel series)
 Love and Death (Angel novel)
 "Lovers Walk" (Buffy the Vampire Slayer episode)
 "Loyalty" (Angel episode)
 "Lullaby" (Angel episode)

M
 Maggie Walsh
 "The Magic Bullet" (Angel episode)
 Marti Noxon
 Marc Blucas
 Marcus Hamilton
 The Master (Buffy the Vampire Slayer)
 Mayor (Buffy the Vampire Slayer)
 Mere Smith
 Michelle Trachtenberg
 Monolith (Angel novel)
 Monster Island (Buffy/Angel novel)
 Mortal Fear (Buffy novel)
 Music in Buffy the Vampire Slayer and Angel
 Mutant Enemy Productions

N
 Nancy Holder
 Nemesis (Angel novel)
 "Never Kill a Boy on the First Date" (Buffy the Vampire Slayer episode)
 "Never Leave Me" (Buffy the Vampire Slayer episode)
 "New Moon Rising" (Buffy the Vampire Slayer episode)
 Nicholas Brendon
 Night of the Living Rerun (Buffy novel)
 "Nightmares" (Buffy the Vampire Slayer episode)
 Nikki Wood
 No Future for You (Buffy comic)
 "No Place Like Home" (Buffy the Vampire Slayer episode)
 "Normal Again" (Buffy the Vampire Slayer episode)
 "Not Fade Away" (Angel episode)
 Not Forgotten (Angel novel)
 Notes from the Underground (Buffy comic)

O
 Obsidian Fate (Buffy novel)
 "Offspring" (Angel episode)
 Old Friends (Angel comic)
 Old Ones (Buffy the Vampire Slayer)
 "Older and Far Away" (Buffy the Vampire Slayer episode)
 "Once More, with Feeling" (Buffy the Vampire Slayer episode)
 "Origin" (Angel episode)
 The Origin (Buffy comic)
 "Orpheus" (Angel episode)
 "Out of Mind, Out of Sight" (Buffy the Vampire Slayer episode)
 "Out of My Mind" (Buffy the Vampire Slayer episode)
 Out of the Woodwork (Buffy comic)
 "Over the Rainbow" (Angel episode)
 Oz (Buffy comic)
 Oz (Buffy the Vampire Slayer)
 Oz: Into the Wild (Buffy novel)

P
 "The Pack" (Buffy the Vampire Slayer episode)
 Paleo (Buffy novel)
 "Pangs" (Buffy the Vampire Slayer episode)
 "Parting Gifts" (Angel episode)
 "Passion" (Buffy the Vampire Slayer episode)
 Past Lives (Buffy/Angel comic)
 "Peace Out" (Angel episode)
 "Phases" (Buffy the Vampire Slayer episode)
 "Players" (Angel episode)
 Portal Through Time (Buffy novel)
 "Potential" (Buffy the Vampire Slayer episode)
 "Power Play" (Angel episode)
 Power of Persuasion (Buffy novel)
 Powers That Be (Angel)
 Predators and Prey (Buffy comic)
 "The Price" (Angel episode)
 Prime Evil (Buffy novel)
 "Primeval" (Buffy the Vampire Slayer episode)
 Principal Snyder
 "The Prodigal" (Angel episode)
 "The Prom" (Buffy the Vampire Slayer episode)
 "Prophecy Girl" (Buffy the Vampire Slayer episode)
 "Provider" (Angel episode)
 "The Puppet Show" (Buffy the Vampire Slayer episode)

Q
 Queen of the Slayers (Buffy novel)
 "Quickening" (Angel episode)

R
 "Real Me" (Buffy the Vampire Slayer episode)
 Rebecca Rand Kirshner
 "Redefinition" (Angel episode)
 Redemption (Angel novel)
 "Release" (Angel episode)
 The Remaining Sunlight (Buffy comic)
 "The Replacement" (Buffy the Vampire Slayer episode)
 "Reprise" (Angel episode)
 "Reptile Boy" (Buffy the Vampire Slayer episode)
 "Restless" (Buffy the Vampire Slayer episode)
 Resurrecting Ravana (Buffy novel)
 Retreat (Buffy comic)
 Return to Chaos (Buffy novel)
 "Reunion" (Angel episode)
 Reunion (Buffy comic)
 "Revelations" (Buffy the Vampire Slayer episode)
 Revenant (Buffy novel)
 Riley Finn
 "The Ring" (Angel episode)
 Ring of Fire (Buffy comic)
 "Rm w/a Vu" (Angel episode)
 Robin Wood (Buffy the Vampire Slayer)
 Rupert Giles

S
 "Sacrifice" (Angel episode)
 "Salvage" (Angel episode)
 Sam Lawson
 "Same Time, Same Place" (Buffy the Vampire Slayer episode)
 "Sanctuary" (Angel episode)
 Sanctuary (Angel novel)
 Sarah Michelle Gellar
 "School Hard" (Buffy the Vampire Slayer episode)
 Scott Hope
 "Seeing Red" (Buffy the Vampire Slayer episode)
 "Selfless" (Buffy the Vampire Slayer episode)
 "Sense & Sensitivity" (Angel episode)
 Seth Green
 Seven Crows (Buffy/Angel novel)
 "Shadow" (Buffy the Vampire Slayer episode)
 Shakedown (Angel novel)
 "She" (Angel episode)
 "Shells" (Angel episode)
 "Shiny Happy People" (Angel episode)
 "The Shroud of Rahmon" (Angel episode)
 "Showtime" (Buffy the Vampire Slayer episode)
 Sins of the Father (Buffy novel)
 Slayer (Buffy the Vampire Slayer)
 Slayer, Interrupted (Buffy comic)
 "Sleep Tight" (Angel episode)
 "Sleeper" (Buffy the Vampire Slayer episode)
 "Slouching Toward Bethlehem" (Angel episode)
 Sluggoth Demon
 "Smashed" (Buffy the Vampire Slayer episode)
 "Smile Time" (Angel episode)
 Solitary Man (Angel novel)
 "Some Assembly Required" (Buffy the Vampire Slayer episode)
 "Something Blue" (Buffy the Vampire Slayer episode)
 "Somnambulist" (Angel episode)
 "Soul Purpose" (Angel episode)
 Soul Trade (Angel novel)
 "Soulless" (Angel episode)
 Spark and Burn (Buffy novel)
 Spike (Buffy the Vampire Slayer)
 Spike: Lost and Found (Angel comic)
 Spike: Old Times (Angel comic)
 Spike: Old Wounds (Angel comic)
 Spike & Dru (Buffy comic)
 Spike and Dru: Pretty Maids All in a Row (Buffy novel)
 Spike vs. Dracula (Angel comic)
 "Spin the Bottle" (Angel episode)
 "Spiral" (Buffy the Vampire Slayer episode)
 A Stake to the Heart (Buffy comic)
 Steven S. DeKnight
 Stephanie Romanov
 "Storyteller" (Buffy the Vampire Slayer episode)
 Strange Bedfellows (Angel comic)
 Stranger to the Sun (Angel novel)
 The Suicide King (Buffy novel)
 The Summoned (Angel novel)
 Sunnydale High Yearbook "Superstar" (Buffy the Vampire Slayer episode)
 "Supersymmetry" (Angel episode)
 "Surrogate" (Buffy the Vampire Slayer episode)
 Surrogates (Angel comic)
 Sweet Sixteen (Buffy novel)

T
 "Tabula Rasa" (Buffy the Vampire Slayer episode)
 Tales of the Slayer (short story collections)
 Tales of the Slayers (Buffy comic)
 Tales of the Vampires (Buffy comic)
 Tara Maclay
 "Teacher's Pet" (Buffy the Vampire Slayer episode)
 "Ted" (Buffy the Vampire Slayer episode)
 Tempted Champions (Buffy novel)
 "That Old Gang of Mine" (Angel episode)
 "That Vision Thing" (Angel episode)
 "There's No Place Like Plrtz Glrb" (Angel episode)
 These Our Actors (Buffy novel)
 "The Thin Dead Line" (Angel episode)
 "This Year's Girl" (Buffy episode)
 Thomas Lenk
 "Through the Looking Glass" (Angel episode)
 Tim Minear
 "Time Bomb" (Angel episode)
 Time of Your Life (Buffy comic)
 "To Shanshu in L.A." (Angel episode)
 "Tomorrow" (Angel episode)
 "Touched" (Buffy the Vampire Slayer episode)
 "Tough Love" (Buffy the Vampire Slayer episode)
 "The Trial" (Angel episode)
 "Triangle" (Buffy the Vampire Slayer episode)
 Trio (Buffy the Vampire Slayer)
 Turok-Han
 Twilight (Buffy comic)
 "Two to Go" (Buffy the Vampire Slayer episode)

U
 Ugly Little Monsters (Buffy comic)
 Unaired Buffy the Vampire Slayer pilot
 "Underneath" (Angel episode)
 Undeveloped Buffy the Vampire Slayer spinoffs
 Uninvited Guests (Buffy comic)
 "Unleashed" (Angel episode)
 Unnatural Selection (Buffy novel)
 Unofficial Buffy the Vampire Slayer productions
 Unseen (Buffy/Angel novel)
 "Untouched" (Angel episode)

V
 Vampire (Buffy the Vampire Slayer)
 Vengeance (Angel novel)
 "Villains" (Buffy the Vampire Slayer episode)
 Vincent Kartheiser
 Visitors (Buffy novel)
 Viva Las Buffy! (Buffy comic)

W
 "Waiting in the Wings" (Angel episode)
 "War Zone" (Angel episode)
 Warren Mears
 Watcher (Buffy the Vampire Slayer)
 "The Weight of the World" (Buffy the Vampire Slayer episode)
 "Welcome to the Hellmouth" (Buffy the Vampire Slayer episode)
 Werewolf (Buffy the Vampire Slayer)
 Wesley: Spotlight (Angel comic)
 Wesley Wyndam-Pryce
 "What's My Line" (Buffy the Vampire Slayer episodes) (two-part episode)
 Whedonesque.com
 "When She Was Bad" (Buffy the Vampire Slayer episode)
 "Where the Wild Things Are" (Buffy the Vampire Slayer episode)
 "Who Are You" (Buffy the Vampire Slayer episode)
 "Why We Fight" (Angel episode)
 Wicked Willow (Buffy novel trilogy)
 "Wild at Heart" (Buffy the Vampire Slayer episode)
 Willow Rosenberg
 Winifred Burkle
 Wisdom of War (Buffy novel)
 "The Wish" (Buffy the Vampire Slayer episode)
 Witch (Buffy the Vampire Slayer)
 "Witch" (Buffy the Vampire Slayer episode)
 Wolves at the Gate (Buffy comic)
 "Wrecked" (Buffy the Vampire Slayer episode)

X
 Xander Harris

Y
 "The Yoko Factor" (Buffy the Vampire Slayer episode)
 "You're Welcome" (Angel episode)

Z
 "The Zeppo" (Buffy the Vampire Slayer'' episode)

Buffyverse
Buffy the Vampire Slayer